Spirospermum is a genus of flowering plants belonging to the family Menispermaceae.

Its native range is Madagascar.

Species:
 Spirospermum penduliflorum DC.

References

Menispermaceae
Menispermaceae genera